The 2017 Porsche Tennis Grand Prix was a women's tennis tournament played on indoor clay courts. It was the 40th edition of the Porsche Tennis Grand Prix, and part of the Premier tournaments of the 2017 WTA Tour. It took place at the Porsche Arena in Stuttgart, Germany, from 24 to 30 April 2017.

Besides the prize money, the singles champion won a Porsche 911 Carrera GTS Cabriolet sports car.

Maria Sharapova made her return to competitive tennis at the tournament, following her 15-month suspension for taking the banned substance meldonium at the 2016 Australian Open.

Points and prize money

Point distribution

Prize money 

* per team

Singles main draw entrants

Seeds 

 1 Rankings are as of April 17, 2017.

Other entrants 
The following players received wildcards into the main draw:
  Johanna Konta
  Maria Sharapova
  Laura Siegemund

The following players received entry from the qualifying draw:
  Naomi Osaka
  Jeļena Ostapenko
  Tamara Korpatsch
  Anett Kontaveit

The following player received entry as a lucky loser:
  Jennifer Brady

Withdrawals 
Before the tournament
  Dominika Cibulková →replaced by  Jennifer Brady
  Caroline Garcia →replaced by  Zhang Shuai
  Madison Keys →replaced by  Daria Kasatkina

Doubles main draw entrants

Seeds 

 1 Rankings are as of April 17, 2017.

Other entrants 
The following pair received a wildcard into the main draw:
  Annika Beck /  Anna Zaja

Finals

Singles 

 Laura Siegemund defeated  Kristina Mladenovic, 6–1, 2–6, 7–6(7–5)

Doubles 

  Raquel Atawo /  Jeļena Ostapenko defeated  Abigail Spears /  Katarina Srebotnik, 6-4, 6–4

References

External links 
 
 Women's Tennis Association (WTA) tournament profile
 Women's Tennis Association (WTA) tournament event details

Porsche Tennis Grand Prix
Porsche Tennis Grand Prix
Porsche Tennis Grand Prix
2010s in Baden-Württemberg
Porsch